The Rennell gerygone (Gerygone citrina) is a species of bird in the family Acanthizidae.
It is found on Rennell Island. It was formerly considered a subspecies of the fan-tailed gerygone (Gerygone flavolateralis), but was split as a distinct species by the IOC in 2021.

Its natural habitat is subtropical or tropical moist montane forests.

References

Rennell gerygone
Birds of Rennell Island
Rennell gerygone
Rennell gerygone